The Hawthorn Railway Bridge is a steel truss bridge that crosses the Yarra River  east of Melbourne between Burnley and Hawthorn stations on the Alamein, Belgrave and Lilydale railway lines. It was built for the Melbourne and Suburban Railway Company and is the oldest extant railway bridge over the Yarra River.

Completed in 1861, Hawthorn Railway Bridge was designed by Francis Bell. The opening had been delayed due to delays in completion of the bridge with the original iron trusses having been lost at sea. The contractors were George Cornwell and Co (not Goldsack & Co as recorded in Leo Harrigan's history of Victorian railways).

Cornwell had previously been involved as contractor in many other major construction works including the Melbourne and Suburban Railway as a whole, as well as Melbourne Grammar School, the Model School, Coppin's Haymarket Theatre, and the Sunbury railway goods shed. Subsequently, he was a contractor on Parliament House, Albert Park Station, Jack's Magazine and the Wallaby Creek water supply. 
 
It is likely that Alexander Kennedy Smith, who had designed the Cremorne Railway Bridge for the Melbourne and Suburban Railway Co, was also involved in the design of the Hawthorn Bridge, but was perhaps out of his depth. He ordered trusses which were inadequate for the job, and had to shorten them, suggesting he did not understand the design.

The opening of the bridge on 13 April 1861 allowed the Melbourne and Suburban Railway Company to extend its line from Pic Nic railway station (east of Burnley) to Hawthorn. The earliest views of the bridge show it to consist of a deck lattice girder with five intersects. The main span over the river was flanked by segmental stone arch spans on either side.

A new double-track bridge using large double Warren trusses was built on its north side in 1912. One of the previous wrought iron lattice trusses was left in place.

The bridge was extended westwards in 1938–39 when a new span was added to cross the Yarra Boulevard, which was constructed by sustenance workers during the Depression as a scenic drive. In 1971, the original piers were strengthened and a metal girder span added to accommodate a third track.

References

Railway bridges in Victoria (Australia)
Bridges in Melbourne
Bridges over the Yarra River
Bridges completed in 1861
1861 establishments in Australia
Transport in the City of Yarra
Transport in the City of Boroondara
Buildings and structures in the City of Yarra
Buildings and structures in the City of Boroondara